Costoma cirrophaea is a moth in the family Depressariidae. It was described by Edward Meyrick in 1924. It is found in Bolivia.

The wingspan is 26–28 mm. The forewings are ashy-ochreous grey with a narrow yellow basal fascia, edged posteriorly with ferruginous suffusion. From beyond this a rather broad light yellow costal stripe runs to near the apex and the dorsal and terminal edge are slenderly light yellow. The hindwings are yellow whitish, suffused pale grey posteriorly.

References

Moths described in 1924
Depressariinae